Shāpūr (meaning son of the king) or Sapor is a Persian male given name. It is first attested in Middle Persian as Shāhpuhr. The Armenian form is Շապուհ Šapuh or Սեպուհ Sepuh.

Sasanian kings
Shapur can refer to one of four Sasanian kings:

Shapur I (r. 241–272)
Shapur II (r. 309–379)
Shapur III (r. 383–388)
Shapur IV (r. 420)
Shapur-i Shahrvaraz (r. 630)

Other people
Shapur may also refer to:

Vramshapuh or Bahram-Shapur, a Prince who served as a Sasanian Client King of Arsacid Armenia from 389 until 417.
Shapur Mihran, a 5th-century Iranian noble from the House of Mihran, who served as the marzban (governor) of Persian Armenia briefly in 482.
Shapur of Ray or Shapur Razi, a 5th-century Iranian from the House of Mihran, who served as the marzban (governor) of Persian Armenia from 483 to 484.
Shapur (Bavandid ruler) (died 825), local ruler in Tabaristan
Shapur Bakhtiar (1915–1991), former Prime Minister of Iran
Shapur ibn Sahl, a ninth-century Persian Christian physician from the Academy of Gundishapur
Sapor of Bet-Nicator was the Christian bishop of Bet-Nicator
Maharsapor (or Sapor; died 421), an early Christian martyr of Persia. 
Shapoor Zadran, an Afghan cricketer
Shapoor Reporter, a British intelligence agent
Pallonji Shapoorji Mistry (born 1929), Indian-born Irish businessman
Mar Shapur also known as Mar Sabor , a Chaldean Assyrian bishop who helped set up a church in present day Kollam, Kerala.

Places 

 Anbar, Iraq was known as Peroz-Shapur in ancient times.

Other
Shapur, a character in Nizami Ganjavi's tale Khusraw and Shirin
Shapoorji Pallonji Group, Indian business conglomerate

See also
Shahpur (disambiguation)

Persian masculine given names